Juan Patricio José Hamilton Depassier (21 September 1927 − 7 September 2008) was a Chilean politician who served as Senator and minister of State under the governments of Eduardo Frei Montalva (1964−1970) and Patricio Aylwin (1990−1994).

References

External Links
 BCN Profile

1927 births
2008 deaths
Politicians from Santiago
Chilean people of British descent
Chilean Roman Catholics
National Falange politicians
Christian Democratic Party (Chile) politicians
Government ministers of Chile
Senators of the XLVI Legislative Period of the National Congress of Chile
Senators of the XLVII Legislative Period of the National Congress of Chile
Senators of the XLIX Legislative Period of the National Congress of Chile
Senators of the L Legislative Period of the National Congress of Chile
Saint George's College, Santiago alumni
University of Chile alumni
Presidents of the University of Chile Student Federation